The Ittihad Kalba Stadium is a stadium located in Kalba, Sharjah, United Arab Emirates, with a capacity of 8,500.

References

Multi-purpose stadiums in the United Arab Emirates